Crouching Tiger, Hidden Dragon was a twelve-volume comic series published by Comics One (Vol. 1–4) and HK Comics Limited (Vol. 1–4 Revised & Expanded Edition, Vol. 5–12), written by Andy Seto. The comic is based on a 5-book series known as the Crane-Iron Pentalogy.

Title
The original title comes from two of the characters' names: Lo and Jen. Lo's name is Luo Tsiao Hu. Tsiao Hu means "little tiger". Jen's name is Yu Jiao Long. Jiao Long means "delicate dragon". Crouching tiger and hidden dragon combined is a Chinese proverb that means "talented or dangerous people hidden from view", which fits both Lo and Jen.

Characters
 Li Mu Bai
 Yu Shu Lien
 Lo or Dark Cloud (Luo Xiao Hu), "Luo" is his family name, and "Xiao Hu" is his first name ("Xiao" means young, little or small and "Hu" means tiger)
 Jen (Yu Jiao Long), "Yu" is her family name and means jade, and "Jiao Long" is her firstname ("Jiao" has multiple meanings: 1. tender, lovely, charming; 2. fragile, frail, delicate; 3. squeamish; 4. pamper, spoil. "Long" means dragon)
 Lu Bi Pei, Jen's husband
 Gao Lang Chiu, Jen's master both in martial arts and literature (Jade Fox is not Jen's master)

References

Comics based on fiction
Manhua titles
Wuxia comics
Comics set in the Qing dynasty
2005 comics endings
Comics based on novels
Comics based on films

pt:O Tigre e o Dragão